The 2018–19 Washington State Cougars men's basketball team represented Washington State University during the 2018–19 NCAA Division I men's basketball season. The team was led by fifth-year head coach Ernie Kent. The Cougars played their home games at the Beasley Coliseum in Pullman, Washington as members in the Pac-12 Conference. They finished the season 11–21, 4–14 in Pac-12 play to finish in 11th place. They lost in the first round of the Pac-12 tournament to Oregon.

At the conclusion of the season, Kent was fired.

Previous season
The Cougars finished the 2017–18 season 12–19, 4–14 in Pac-12 play to finish in 11th place. They lost in the first round of the Pac-12 tournament to Oregon.

Offseason

Departures

Incoming transfers

2018 recruiting class

Roster

Schedule and results

|-
!colspan=9 style=| Exhibition

|-
!colspan=9 style=| Non-conference regular season

|-
!colspan=9 style=| Pac-12 regular season

|-
!colspan=9 style=| Pac-12 Tournament

References

Washington State Cougars men's basketball seasons
Washington State
Washington State
Washington State